Here Again is an album by American singer Johnny Nash, released in 1986. The album features a minor comeback hit, with the late-1985 single "Rock Me Baby" reaching the Top-20 on the Swiss album charts.  The follow-up single, "Baby You're Mine" was less successful.

With this album, Nash had hoped for a successful comeback, but it did not make a significant impact on the charts.

Track listing 

 "Born to Sing" (Alvin A. Davies, John Barnes) - (5:09)	
 "Precious Lady" (Alvin A. Davies) = (5:20)	
 "Rock Me Baby" (Johnny Nash) - (4:30)	
 "Island Girl" (Alvin A. Davies) - (4:03)	
 "Baby You're Mine" (Carl Williams) - (3:30)	
 "Mansion in the Sky" (Alvin A. Davies, Odell Brown) - (4:38)	
 "Here Again" (Alvin A. Davies) - (5:50)	
 "We Got Troubles" (Carl Williams) - (4:32)	
 "Now You're Gone" (Alvin A. Davies) - (4:10)	
 "Never Going Back" (Carl Williams) - (4:26)

References

Johnny Nash albums
1986 albums
London Records albums